Physopleurella mundula is a species of bug in the family Lyctocoridae. It is found in Oceania.

References

Further reading

 

Lyctocoridae
Articles created by Qbugbot
Insects described in 1877